American Australians are Australian citizens who are of American descent, including immigrants and residents who are descended from migrants from the United States of America and its territories. This includes people of European, African American, American Indian, Hispanic or Latin American, Asian, and Pacific Islander backgrounds.

Demography

At the 2006 Australian Census, 71,718 Australian residents declared that they were American-born.  Concentrations of American-born residents were in Sydney (16,339), Melbourne (11,130), Brisbane (6,057), Perth (5,558), Adelaide (2,862), and Canberra (1,970). At that census, residents could declare up to two ancestries: of the 56,283 respondents declaring American ancestry, 3,901 also declared Hispanic ancestry; 1,798, African American; 3,936, North American Indian; and 224, Puerto Rican.

Community history
The first North Americans to land in Australia were British crewmen from the Endeavour under Captain Cook, who sojourned at Botany Bay in 1770. Once a permanent colony was established in New South Wales, "trade links were developed almost exclusively with North America."

The North American colonies, including what are now Canada and the United States, had been used by Britain for penal transportation. With the recognition of the independence of the United States in the 1780s, the British Government sought new lands to exile convicts, and Australia became the pre-eminent prison colony of the British Empire.

From the 1770s to the 1840s, North Americans settled in Australia primarily as demobilised British soldiers and sailors; as convicts (some United States citizens were arrested at sea for maritime offences, tried, convicted, and transported); and as whalers, sealers, or itinerants. Many of these settlers moved on to New Zealand for a time, and often returned to New South Wales. African Americans had a noted presence in the earliest British outposts in Australia, usually after a period of service in the British Navy.

In the 1850s, large numbers of United States citizens arrived, most often after spending time in California during its gold rush. These migrants settled predominantly in rural Victoria, where the discovery of gold had encouraged a large colony of prospectors and speculators. Some born in the United States played eminent roles in the Eureka Stockade, particularly in the miners' paramilitary self-defence groups. The colonial authorities suspected the American-born and others, such as the Irish, of promoting republicanism.

At the time of Federation, in 1901, there were 7,448 United States-born persons in Australia. About this time, many of these American-Australians worked in the labour movement, including the formation of trade unions and the Australian Labor Party (hence the spelling of Labor in the American way instead of the more common Labour; both spellings were acceptable in Australian English at the time). Despite North American socio-cultural influences, Australian public opinion was wary of the United States: the visit of the "Great White Fleet" of the United States Navy to Sydney and Melbourne in 1908 was greeted with fanfare, but provoked immediate comment that the (British) Royal Navy should make an even greater show of force to restate in the strongest military terms Australia's position as the south-eastern guarantor of the British Empire.

During the Second World War, more than a million United States soldiers were stationed, not all simultaneously, in Australia at the request of the Australian Government after the surrender of the British garrison in Singapore to the Japanese in 1941. When the war ended, 12,000 Australian women migrated to the United States as war brides, and 10,000 United States citizens settled in Australia—including ex-servicemen as war husbands.

The ANZUS Treaty, binding the United States, Australia, and New Zealand, was signed in 1951, locking the three countries into a mutual defence pact. This increased social and political ties between Australia and the United States and led Australia and New Zealand to commit soldiers to the Vietnam War in the 1960s and 1970s. These connections, along with increased worldwide travel, prompted more Americans to migrate permanently; in 1971 there were 39,035 United States–born residents in Australia.

Education
The American International School of Sydney is defunct.

Notable people

See also

 African Australians
 American Canadians
 American New Zealanders
 Asian Australians
 Australian Americans
 Australia–United States relations
 European Australians
 Europeans in Oceania
 Immigration to Australia
 Latin American Australians

References

External links
  [CC-By-SA] (Americans in Sydney)

American diaspora
 
Immigration to Australia
American emigration